Neoregelia diversifolia is a species of flowering plant in the genus Neoregelia. This species is endemic to Brazil.

References

diversifolia
Flora of Brazil